Lauren Nicole Platt (born 7 October 1997) is an English television presenter, singer and actress. After finishing fourth in the eleventh series of The X Factor, she presented the CBBC talent series Got What It Takes? from 2016 to 2018.

Early life
Platt was born on 7 October 1997 in Billericay, Essex, but spent ten years living in Spain. In 2010, she auditioned for the role of Louise Mitchell on EastEnders, but lost out to Brittany Papple. In 2011, she was the runner-up of the local talent contest The Essex Factor and in 2012, competed in Open Mic UK. Platt attended The Billericay School, a comprehensive school in Billericay, where she sat her GCSEs.

Career

2014: The X Factor
Platt auditioned for The X Factor in 2014, and became the youngest solo contestant to reach the live finals. With the eliminations of Stephanie Nala and Chloe Jasmine in week two and Lola Saunders in week four, Platt became Cheryl's last remaining act in the competition. In the quarter-final, Platt was in the bottom two with Stereo Kicks, but advanced to the semi-final after Cowell sent the result to the deadlock and Stereo Kicks were eliminated as the act with the fewest public votes. However, in the semi-final, Platt was in the bottom two with Andrea Faustini and was eliminated with only her mentor voting to send Platt through to the final, finishing in fourth place. After the series finished, voting statistics revealed that Platt had received more votes than Faustini. This meant that if there was not a Final Showdown, or if Walsh or Cowell voted to send Platt through to the final and the result to deadlock, Platt would've advanced to the final and Faustini would've been eliminated.

2016–present: Got What It Takes? and theatre roles

In August 2015, Platt announced that she would present the CBBC talent series Got What It Takes?. She presented the series until 2018, when Anna Maynard took over the role.

Later in 2018, Platt portrayed the role of Jack in a stage production of Jack and the Beanstalk. In March 2019, she portrayed Belle in a production of Beauty and the Beast. Later that year, Platt appeared as Aurora in a production of Sleeping Beauty.

References

External links

1997 births
Living people
Beauty and makeup YouTubers
English stage actresses
English television presenters
English video bloggers
English YouTubers
Fashion YouTubers
Game show contestants
Lifestyle YouTubers
21st-century English women singers
21st-century English singers
People educated at The Billericay School
People from Billericay
The X Factor contestants
Music YouTubers